The 2018 Berlin Marathon was the 45th edition of the Berlin Marathon. The marathon took place in Berlin, Germany, on 16 September 2018 and was the fourth World Marathon Majors race of the year. The men's race was won by Eliud Kipchoge, who set a new world record time of 2:01:39. The women's race was won by Gladys Cherono in a time of 2:18:11.

Men's race
Eventual winner Eliud Kipchoge began the race with three pacemakers dedicated to him. After 5 km the gap between him and the Kipsang group was 9 seconds. After 15 km two of the pacemakers were unable to continue pacing him. The remaining pacemaker dropped out after 25 kilometres, leaving Kipchoge to cover the final 17 km alone. Kipchoge had planned to run with a pacemaker through 30 km; this adversity "was unfortunate," he reflected post-race, "but I had to believe". Kipchoge accelerated, covering the second half (1:00:33) of the race faster than the first half (1:01:06).  In sunny weather conditions, the temperature was 14 °C (57 °F) during the start and 18 °C (64 °F) when Kipchoge crossed the finish line.

Before the race, Kipchoge stated that he planned to run a new personal best. The prize money he made for his Berlin run was €120,000, consisting of €30,000 for finishing in less than 2:04 hours, €40,000 for the win and a further €50,000 for setting a new world record. The world record set during this run was the 8th world record in 20 years in the men's marathon at the Berlin marathon. During the run, Kipchoge used Nike Zoom Vaporfly 4% shoes.

The pace during the run averaged to 2:53/km (4:38/mile). The second half of the race in 1:00:33, and the last 10 km was covered in 28:33.

It was the most evenly paced marathon ever recorded, with the fastest 5 km interval covered in 14:18 and the slowest in 14:37, a difference of only 19 seconds.

Results

Men

Women

References

External links
Berlin Marathon

2018 in Berlin
Berlin Marathon
Berlin Marathon
Berlin Marathon
September 2018 sports events in Germany